Blackberry Township may refer to:

 Blackberry Township, Illinois, United States
 Blackberry Township, Minnesota, United States

See also

 Blueberry Township

Township name disambiguation pages